Charis Romas or Haris Romas (Greek: Χάρης Ρώμας) is a Greek actor, screenwriter, and lyricist.  He was born on 23 March 1960 in Piraeus as Haralambos Rassias (Χαράλαμπος Ρασσιάς). He is most well known for co-writing and starring in the popular TV shows Konstantinou kai Elenis and To kafe tis Charas, where he played the iconic roles of Konstantinos Katakouzinos and Periandros Popotas respectively.

He is also a politician, having run as an alderman for the region of Attica in the 2019 Greek local elections.

Biography

He was born with the name Charalambos Rassias in 1960.
He graduated from the Moraitis school and entered the medical school of Athens.
When he was 25 years old he married a fellow student and the marriage lasted only for 2 years.
Instead of a doctor, he chose to become an actor and he studied in the dramatic schools of theater of art Katselis. His parents did not agree with this decision and especially his father, who stopped talking to him and forbade him to use his surname. For this reason, he adopted the surname of his mother. His relationship with his father recovered only shortly before his mother's death.

Filmography

Animated films
 Quest for Camelot (Devon) (Greek version)
 The Wild (Nigel the Koala) (Greek version)

References

External links

1960 births
Living people
20th-century Greek male actors
21st-century Greek male actors
Greek male film actors
Greek male stage actors
Greek comedians
Greek screenwriters
Writers from Piraeus
Actors from Piraeus